Yi Inmun (1745-1821), also known as Yuchun, was a court painter of the late Joseon Dynasty, primarily of landscapes.  He also held a military position in the court.  Perhaps his best-known work is a silk scroll entitled Gangsan mujindo (Streams and Mountains Without End; hangul: 강산무진도; hanja: 江山無盡圖), which is displayed in the National Museum of Korea in Seoul.

In 1968, the American composer Alan Hovhaness (who had visited South Korea in 1963) composed a chamber symphony inspired by Yi's painting, entitled Mountains and Rivers Without End.

See also
Korean painting
List of Korean painters
Korean art
Korean culture

References
http://www.artnet.com/library/09/0928/T092841.asp accessed August 13, 2005
http://www.metmuseum.org/toah/hd/mowa/hd_mowa.htm accessed August 13, 2005

External links
http://www.towooart.com/oldart/old_korea/leeinmun/leeinmun.htm
Arts of Korea, an exhibition catalog from The Metropolitan Museum of Art Libraries (fully available online as PDF), which contains material on Yi In-mun

1745 births
1821 deaths
18th-century Korean painters
19th-century Korean painters
Court painters